Amphibola is a genus of small, air-breathing terrestrial or semi-marine snails with an operculum, pulmonate gastropod molluscs in the family Amphibolidae.

Species
Species within the genus Amphibola include: 
 Amphibola africana (E. A. Smith, 1904)
 Amphibola crenata (Gmelin, 1791)
Species brought into synonymy
 Amphibola australis Schumacher, 1817: synonym of Amphibola crenata (Gmelin, 1791)
 Amphibola avellana (Bruguière, 1789): synonym of Amphibola crenata (Gmelin, 1791)
 Amphibola burmana Blanford, 1867: synonym of Salinator burmana (Blanford, 1867)
 Amphibola crenata (Martyn, 1786): synonym of Amphibola crenata (Gmelin, 1791)
 Amphibola obvoluta Jonas, 1846: synonym of Amphibola crenata (Gmelin, 1791)
 Amphibola sanchezi Quadras & Möllendorf, 1894: synonym of Salinator sanchezi (Quadras & Möllendorf, 1894)
 Amphibola solida Martens, 1878: synonym of Phallomedusa solida (Martens, 1878)
Species inquirenda
 Amphibola quadrasi Möllendorf, 1894

References

 Golding R.E., Ponder W.F. & Byrne M. 2007. Taxonomy and anatomy of Amphiboloidea (Gastropoda: Heterobranchia: Archaeopulmonata). Zootaxa 1476: 1-50 page(s): 6

Amphibolidae